Thomas Pierson (born March 11, 1948 Ashland, Wisconsin) is an American composer, conductor and film director.

At the age of 13, he debuted as a soloist with the Houston Symphony. He studied at the Juilliard School to become a classical pianist and later turned to jazz.  He conducted Leonard Bernstein's Mass at the Metropolitan Opera. He has conducted other works as well, including Candide. He has scored films for Woody Allen, notably Manhattan, and Robert Altman's Quintet. He filmed Turkey Boy in Japan in 2008.

Work
 Songs from the movie "Turkey Boy", 2008, CD
 "Turkey Boy", 2008, DVD
 Deep Forest By Bruce Huebner, Zabu Tone Music ZT006, CD 2008, as pianist
 Olathe By Richie Pratt, Artists Recording Collective ARC-2093, CD 2007, as pianist
 The Hidden Goddess, 2003, CD, ©Point of No Return Music (806635019475), AUTEUR
 Left, Right, 2001, CD
 Tom Pierson III, 1999, CD, Oglio Records
 Planet of Tears, 1990, CD
 American Playhouse, 1982, orchestrator; 1 episode - Working TV episode
 Popeye (film), 1980, composer: additional score
 Manhattan (film), 1979, music adapted/arranged by
 Hair (film), 1979, conductor/arranger, vocals, as Thomas Pierson
 Quintet (film), 1979
 A Perfect Couple, 1979, Orchestra Conductor
 The World of Magic, NBC 1975, hosted by Bill Cosby, as Music Director

References

Further sources
 Blue Nippon: authenticating jazz in Japan By E. Taylor Atkins, Duke University Press (November 2001), 
 Japan Pop!: Inside the World of Japanese Popular Culture (Paperback), By Timothy J. Craig (Editor), M.E. Sharpe (June 2000), 
 Patricia Myers, JAZZ TIMES Jun 1997, Magagine, by JazzTimes, Inc., 144 pages, 
 p. 273, Manhattan, cf. The Bent Lens: A world guide to gay and lesbian film By Lisa Daniel, Claire Jackson, ALLEN & UNWIN, March 2003, 
 p. 314, 329, cf. Gil Evans: Out of the Cool: His Life and Music (Hardcover), By Stephanie Stein Crease, Chicago Review Press; illustrated edition (October 1, 2001),

External links

Tom Pierson biography, Senzoku Gakuen College of Music (in Japanese)
Tom Pierson Profile, Kunitachi College of Music

1948 births
Living people
People from Ashland, Wisconsin
American male composers
21st-century American composers
Musicians from Wisconsin
Juilliard School alumni
21st-century American male musicians